The 2007–08 FA Trophy was the 38th season of the FA's cup competition for teams at levels 5–8 of the English football league system. 258 teams were entered for the competition.

Calendar

Preliminary round
· Ties will be played on 6 October 2007.

Ties

Replays

1st qualifying round
Ties will be played on 20 October 2007

Teams from Premier Division of Southern League, Northern Premier League and Isthmian League entered in this round.

Ties

Replays

2nd qualifying round
· Ties will be played on 3 November 2007.

Ties

Replays

3rd qualifying round
The teams from Conference North and Conference South entered in this round.

Ties will be played on 24 November 2007.

Ties

Replays

First round
This round is the first in which Conference Premier teams join those from lower reaches of the National League System.

Ties will be played on 15 December 2007.

Ties

Replays

Second round
The draw was made on 17 December 2007.
Ties will be played on 12 January 2008.

Ties

Replays

Third round
The draw was made on 14 January 2008.
Ties will be played on 2 February 2008.

Ties

Ties

Fourth round
The draw was made on 4 February 2008.
Ties will be played on 23 February 2008.

Replays

Semi-finals
The draw was made on 25 February 2008.
The two-legged ties will be played on 8 March and 15 March 2008.

First legs

Second legs

Ebbsfleet United win 4–2 on aggregate

Torquay United win 2–1 on aggregate

Final

The Starting Teams were:

Torquay United; 21 Martin Rice, 3 Kevin Nicholson, 4 Steve Woods (c), 6 Chris Todd, 7 Lee Mansell, 8 Tim Sills, (11 Kevin Hill 89mins) 10 Lee Phillips (19 Danny Stevens 46mins) 14 Chris Hargreaves, 20 Roscoe D'Sane (9 Elliot Benyon 66mins) 24 Steve Adams, 26 Chris Zebroski.
Subs Not Used 5 Chris Robertson, 16 Matt Hockley.

Ebbsfleet United; 1 Lance Cronin, 2 Peter Hawkins, 3 Sacha Opinel, 5 James Smith, 6 Paul McCarthy (c), 8 Stacy Long (4 Gary McDonald 84mins) 12 Chris McPhee, 14 Neil Barrett, 18 Luke Moore, 19 John Akinde, 25 Micheal Bostwick.
Substitutes 21 Sam Mott, 10 Chukki Erribenne, 15 Mark Ricketts, 17 George Purcell.

References

General
 Football Club History Database: FA Trophy 2007–08

Specific

2007–08 domestic association football cups
League
2007-08